The Troféu Inconfidência  is a tournament organized by the Federação Mineira de Futebol.

Name 
The name of the competition is a tribute to the Inconfidência Mineira movement.

Qualification 
It reunites the clubs who qualified between the 5th and 8th position of the first stage of the Campeonato Mineiro - Módulo I.

Relevance 
The tournament serves as a qualifier for the Campeonato Brasileiro Série D.

List of champions

Following is the list with all the champions of the Troféu Inconfidência.

Notes

In 2020 edition, Cruzeiro EC refused to play against Uberlândia EC.

Titles by team

External links
 FMF official website

References

Football competitions in Minas Gerais